County routes in Delaware County, New York, are signed with the Manual on Uniform Traffic Control Devices-standard yellow-on-blue pentagon route marker.

Traditionally, county routes are signed at each end of the road which the county maintains. This means that many county route markers are only placed at village limits, and there are often no signs pointing the way for motorists to find these routes from main streets.
 For example, CR 18 can be considered discontinuous, as it is not maintained by the county when it moves through the village of Hobart. However, a survey map of the village (in the rear foyer of the Methodist church) shows that the right-of-way would proceed from River Street to Maple Avenue, and then to Pearl Street, where the right-of-way continues to the village of Stamford.
This does not apply to hamlets, however:
 In Andes, "TO" signs are helpfully placed at NY 28 near where CR 1 and CR 2 terminate at the former village line.
 Treadwell has county route signage for CR 14 and CR 16 within its limits.
 CR 18 in South Kortright has signage at the spur across the bridge connecting the hamlet with NY 10.
 CR 41 in Roxbury is signed within the former village limit at its southern terminus with NY 30.

Several county routes are "unusual," as they terminate as local roads in remote areas:
 CR 6 has two beginnings on NY 28. The western section runs from the hamlet of Bovina Center to the hamlet of Bovina; the eastern section runs from New Kingston to NY 28 near an intersection with NY 30 near the village of Margaretville. The road connecting the two sections, New Kingston Road, is maintained by the Town of Middletown.
 CR 22 begins at the Walton village line (as East Brook Road) and runs for 6.5 miles (10.46 km) along East Brook before county maintenance ends. The right-of-way continues as East Brook Road.
 CR 36 (from the eastern terminus of CR 8) runs 3 miles (5 km) outside the hamlet of Denver and terminates at Vega Mountain Road. The right-of-way, Sally's Alley, is a dead-end road.

CR 19 is unique in that it starts on a town road near the village of Deposit (Dug Road, a former alignment of NY 8), and then downgrades back to a town road at the Broome County line, continuing as Beebe Hill Road in Sanford.

Some county routes in Delaware County have no winter road maintenance (plowing, salting, sanding) at night due to safety concerns regarding the mountainous terrain, especially CR 26 between Downsville and Hamden, and CR7/SR206 between Roscoe and Downsville. The county posts signs on these routes warning motorists that there is no nighttime road maintenance in winter months.  Delaware County's highways are very well maintained,  some of the better quality county highways in the state. County highways are marked every 0.2 miles (0.32 km) with a small blue marker and yellow numbering with the route number on top and a mileage number on the bottom. 

Delaware County DPW is also under contract with New York City to provide road maintenance on the city-owned roads circling the Pepacton and Cannonsville Reservoirs. The road around the Pepacton Reservoir is marked as NYC 30A, and the Cannonsville is marked as NYC 10A.

One road formerly maintained by the county is not included in the route list below:
 CR 48 (Laurel Bank Avenue) connects NY 8/10 to Main Street in Deposit. This route was decommissioned by the county in 2011, and is now maintained by the Town of Deposit.

Route list

See also

County routes in New York

References